Candalides geminus, the Geminus blue, is a species of butterfly of the family Lycaenidae. It was described by Edwards and Kerr in 1978. It is found in Australia (the Northern Territory, Queensland and New South Wales).

The wingspan is about 30 mm. Adult females are dark brown with a purple sheen over the centre of the forewing. Adult males are bronzed purple.

The larvae feed on Cassytha pubescens. They are green with a dark line along the back and yellow lines edged in purple along the sides. The pupa is attached to a leaf of the host plant by anal hooks and a girdle.

References

Candalidini
Butterflies described in 1978